Chile started participating in the OTI Festival in 1972 in Madrid and continued participating in an uninterrupted way till the last Show held in 2000 in Acapulco.

History 

This country won the contest in two occasions: the first one in 1984 with the singer-songwriter Fernando Ubiergo with his song "Agualuna" (Moonwater).

The second Chilean victory came in 1998 with the strambotical rapper and comedian Florcita Motuda with his song "Fin de siglo, es hora de inflamarse deprimirse o transformarse" (End of century, It's time to get wild, to get depressed or to transform ourselves).

Apart from their victories, the Chilean member stations got the second place in the festival with Alberto Plaza and his song "Canción contra la tristeza" (A song against sadness) in 1995. Chile also got three third places in 1976 with Alfredo Fuentes and his song "Era solo un chiquillo" ("I was just a little child"), in 1985 with Juan Carlos Duque and his song "Para poder vivir" (To be able to live) and in 1992 with Pablo Herrera and his song "Para poder vivir" (To be able to live).

Chile and its two OTI member stations: Televisión Nacionlal de Chile and Canal 13, organised jointly the event in 1978, due to the refusal of the Nicaraguan broadcaster (previous year's winner) to organise the event because of the civil war. The festival was held in the Municipal Theatre of Santiago, the same venue where the festival was held again in 1986.

National final 
Chile was one of the few OTI Festival participating countries who organised an annual national final in order to select the participating entrant in the contest. The winner, who was elected by a professional jury, would later represent Chile in the festival.

The "Chilean National OTI Contest", which was the official name of the selection process, was also very popular between the local audience and in fact, many famous musicians participated in the national final in order to represent their country in the main event.

The two main Chilean networks that broadcast the festival every year, were also the organisers of the Chilean national final.

Contestants

References 

 
OTI Festival